Pirhuane (possibly from Aymara pirwa, piwra granary, -ni a suffix to indicate ownership, "the one with a granary") is a mountain in the northern extensions of the Vilcanota mountain range in the Andes of Peru, about  high. It is situated in the Cusco Region, Quispicanchi Province, Ocongate District. Pirhuane lies northeast of the lake named Singrenacocha, between the Ayacachi group in the north and the main range in the south.

References

Mountains of Cusco Region
Mountains of Peru